Little Eve may refer to:

 Little Eve, a 2007 album by Kate Miller-Heidke
 Little Eve (book), a 2018 novel by Catriona Ward
 Little Eve Edgarton, a 1916 silent film
 Little Eve and Big Mouth, the successor act to Dutch pop band Mouth and MacNeal

See also 

 Little Eva (disambiguation)

Disambiguation pages